Aliza Bloch (born 1967) is an Israeli educator and politician. In 2018, she became the first female mayor of Beit Shemesh, and in 2019 she was named by The Jerusalem Post as one of the world's 50 most influential Jews.

Biography
The daughter of Jewish immigrants from Morocco, Bloch was born in Israel and grew up in Kiryat Gat. She has an undergraduate degree in mathematics as well as a doctorate in education from Bar Ilan University. She was the vice-principal of the Givat Gonen school in the Katamon neighborhood of Jerusalem. She moved to Beit Shemesh with her husband Aharon in 1992 and served as principal of the Branco-Weiss High School there.

In 2011, she was awarded the Rothschild Prize in Education.

Political career 
Bloch ran unsuccessfully for mayor of Beit Shemesh in 2013. This was attributed to the fact that HaBayit HaYehudi, then under Naftali Bennet, turned their back on Bloch and sided with Eli Cohen for anti-Chareidi candidate. Five years later, in 2018, she defeated 10-year incumbent mayor Moshe Abutbul by 533 votes. Bloch was widely seen as a dark horse candidate and campaigned on a platform of providing better services and infrastructure in Beit Shemesh. Bloch, a Religious Zionist candidate, pledged to unite and accommodate the city's Haredi, secular, and American oleh populations. Bloch was endorsed by a wide spectrum of Israeli political parties, including Jewish Home, Likud, Labor, Kulanu, and Yesh Atid.

During the summer of 2019, Bloch sustained harsh criticism from the Haredi sector over a spate of demolitions of illegally-built synagogues, with workers removing the spray-painted (in Hebrew) slogan "Aliza Bloch = Hitler" from a wall. Other graffiti labeled her a terrorist. On 1 August, a Beit Shemesh synagogue built on Israel Lands Authority property was demolished by the government, with residents blaming the municipality for not interceding enough on their behalf. A few days later, Haredim protested the mistreatment of many families who claimed they were ignored in their basic education and religious needs. In 2021, Bloch fired seven council members [from Degel, Agudah and Likud] for allegedly preventing the development of the city. later, they solved their disagreement.

she worked for building the first sportech at the city. in addition, ship worked for building areas such as S-Park, which will be a project in the planned employment, office and commercial park. The hackathon initiative (a competitive event aimed at producing innovative solutions to a given problem under time pressure) was promoted. The hackathon aims to improve the involvement of the city's residents in community life and to unite the various sectors.

Personal life
Bloch is married to Aharon Bloch and has four children.

See also
Women in Israel

References 

1967 births
Living people
Bar-Ilan University alumni
Israeli educators
Israeli women educators
Women mayors of places in Israel
Israeli people of Moroccan-Jewish descent